Henry Aggrey Bagiire is a Ugandan politician and educator. He served as the State Minister for Agriculture in the Cabinet of Uganda from 16 February 2009 until 27 May 2011. He also served as the elected Member of Parliament (MP) for Bunya County West, Mayuge District, from 2006 to 2009.

Background and education
He was born in present-day Mayuge District on January 27, 1968. Henry Bagiire holds the Diploma in Education, from the Institute of Teacher Education, a component of Kyambogo University, obtained in 1992. His degree of Bachelor of Science in Agriculture, was obtained in 1999, from Makerere University. He also holds the Certificate in Public Administration & Management, obtained in 2003, also from Makerere University.

Career
Bagiire taught agriculture at Bukoyo Secondary School from 1992 until 2000, where he rose to the position of head of the Department of Agriculture. Between 2000 and 2001, he worked as the Leader of a Research Team for the International Food Policy Research Institute. Between 1999 and 2002, he served as the Agricultural Extension Officer for Iganga District. From 2002 until 2006, he served as the chairperson of the Mayuge District Service Commission. In 2006, he entered politics and contested for the parliamentary seat of Bunya Country West, Mayuge District, on the National Resistance Movement party ticket. He was elected. On 16 February 2009, he was appointed Minister of State for Agriculture. During the 2011 national election cycle he lost to Vincent Bagiire, first during the NRM primaries and again in the general election, in which Henry Bagiire ran as an independent candidate.

In the cabinet reshuffle of 27 May 2011, he was dropped from the cabinet and was replaced by Zerubabel Nyiira.

Personal details
He is married. He belongs to the National Resistance Movement political party. His interests include teaching and forest conservation.

See also
 Parliament of Uganda
 Cabinet of Uganda
 Mayuge District

References

External links
 Website of the Parliament of Uganda
 Full Ministerial Cabinet List, June 2006
 Full Ministerial Cabinet List, February 2009
Full Ministerial Cabinet List, May 2011

1968 births
Living people
People from Mayuge District
Makerere University alumni
Kyambogo University alumni
Ugandan educators
Members of the Parliament of Uganda
Government ministers of Uganda
National Resistance Movement politicians